Michael Jerome Moore, known as Michael Jerome is an American rock musician and drummer. He is a former member of the Toadies (1990–91), Course of Empire (1994–1998), and James Hall's band Pleasure Club, which was formed in 2002. He was a member of the Saginaw, Texas band Pop Poppins, a metroplex cult follow. He played on Charlie Musselwhite's 2004 release Sanctuary, and has also toured or recorded with Blind Boys of Alabama, John Cale, Anna Egge, Tom Freund and many others. Jerome is double-jointed and ambidextrous.

Jerome joined the Louisiana-based band Better Than Ezra in 2009, following the departure of the band's drummer of 13 years, Travis McNabb, who had amicably left Better Than Ezra in February 2009 in order to tour full-time with Sugarland. Better Than Ezra's 2009 album, Paper Empire, marked Jerome's recording debut with the band.

He has also toured with Richard Thompson and John Cale. He recorded four albums with Cale – blackAcetate (2005), Circus Live (2007), Extra Playful (2011) and Shifty Adventures in Nookie Wood (2012).

Michael Jerome is co-founder of the trio Halls Of The Machine. Mike Graff (guitars) and Van Eric Martin (piano) are the fellow musicians. Their first album is titled "Atmospheres For Lovers And Sleepers" and was released in 2001.  Their second album "Calling All Tribal Dignitaries" will be released in 2017.

In 2015 the song "Bono X" of Halls Of The Machine was officially released worldwide on the Compilation "I.C. - Independent Celebration, Vol. 1" from the German label "Birdstone Records".

Jerome is a Pittsburgh Steelers fan and resides in Los Angeles, California.

Discography
With Better Than Ezra
Paper Empire (2009)
All Together Now (2014)
With The Blind Boys of Alabama
Spirit of the Century (2001)
Go Tell It on the Mountain (2003)
Atom Bomb (2005)
With John Cale
blackAcetate (2005)
Circus Live (2007)
Extra Playful (2011)
Shifty Adventures in Nookie Wood (2012)
With Course of Empire
Initiation (1994)
Telepathic Last Words (1998)
With Robin Danar
Altered States (2008)
With Ana Egge
Road to My Love (2009)
With Nina Ferraro
The Promise (2010)
With Tom Freund
Fit to Screen (2009)
With Holmes
Complication Simplified (2012)
With Steve Forbert
Over with You (2012)
With Alyssa Graham
The Lock, Stock, and Soul (2011)
With k.d. lang
Recollection (2010)
With Sara Lov
The Young Eyes (2008)
Seasoned Eyes Were Beaming (2009)
With Shelby Lynne
Thanks (2013)
With Taj Mahal
Maestro (2008)
With Meiko
Meiko (2008)
With Charlie Musselwhite
One Night in America (2001)
Sanctuary (2004)
With Keaton Simons
Can You Hear Me (2008)
With Brandi Shearer
Love Don't Make You Juliet (2009)
With Pleasure Club
Here Comes the Trick (2002)
The Fugitive Kind (2004)
With Bill Purdy
Move My Way (2008)
With Po' Girl
Deer in the Night (2009)
With Pop Poppins
The Other Lover (1990)
Delight in Disorder (1991)
Live at the Hop (1992)
Epitome of Simplicity (1992)
Pop Poppins (1993)
Non-Pop Specific (1996)
With Richard Thompson
Semi-Detached Mock Tudor (2002)
1000 Years of Popular Music (2003)
The Old Kit Bag (2003)
Sweet Warrior (2007)
Live Warrior (2009)
Dream Attic (2010)
Electric (2013)
Still (2015)
13 Rivers (2018)
With Ben Ottewell
Shapes & Shadows (2011)
With Wavves
Afraid of Heights (2013)
With Toadies
"Dig a Hole" / "I Hope You Die" (1991)

Compilation appearances 
 I. C. Independent Celebration, Vol. 1 (2015, Birdstone Records) (with Halls Of The Machine: song: "Bono X" (full version on CD; edited version on vinyl)

References

African-American drummers
African-American rock musicians
American alternative rock musicians
American rock drummers
Better Than Ezra members
Living people
Musicians from Wichita, Kansas
1967 births
20th-century American drummers
American male drummers